Aulacothorax is a genus of flea beetles in the family Chrysomelidae. There are at least 20 described species in Aulacothorax, found in the Palearctic, North America, Indomalaya, and Australasia.

The genus was originally created in 1858 for a single species described from Tahiti, Aulacothorax exilis, which was placed in Scydmaenidae (now considered a subfamily of Staphylinidae). Recently, the holotype of this species was rediscovered in the collections of the Swedish Museum of Natural History, and it was found to belong to the flea beetle genus Orthaltica. Aulacothorax is the earliest available name for the genus, so the genus Orthaltica was formally placed in synonymy with it in 2017.

Species

 Aulacothorax arabicus (Medvedev, 1997)
 Aulacothorax australis (Konstantinov, 1995)
 Aulacothorax bakeri (Konstantinov, 1995)
 Aulacothorax borneoensis (Konstantinov, 1995)
 Aulacothorax chibi (Takizawa, 2017)
 Aulacothorax coomani (Laboissiere, 1933)
 Aulacothorax copalinus (Fabricius, 1801)
 Aulacothorax exilis Boheman, 1858
 Aulacothorax kirejtshuki (Konstantinov, 1995)
 Aulacothorax konstantinovi (Takizawa, 2017)
 Aulacothorax melinus (Horn, 1889) (poison ivy leaf beetle)
 Aulacothorax mindanaoensis (Konstantinov, 1995)
 Aulacothorax minutiusculus (Csiki, 1939)
 Aulacothorax okinawanus (Gressitt and Kimoto, 1966)
 Aulacothorax orientalis (Konstantinov, 1995)
 Aulacothorax pahangi (Konstantinov, 1995)
 Aulacothorax parkeri (B. White, 1942)
 Aulacothorax rangoonensis (Konstantinov, 1995)
 Aulacothorax rata (Takizawa, 2017)
 Aulacothorax recticollis (J. L. LeConte, 1861)
 Aulacothorax sabahcola (Takizawa, 2017)
 Aulacothorax schereri (Takizawa, 2017)
 Aulacothorax syzygium (Prathapan & Konstantinov, 2013)
 Aulacothorax terminalia (Prathapan & Konstantinov, 2013)
 Aulacothorax tuberculatus (Takizawa, 2017)
 Aulacothorax visayanensis (Konstantinov, 1995)

References

Alticini
Chrysomelidae genera
Articles created by Qbugbot
Taxa named by Carl Henrik Boheman